Leonard Wilcox (1799–1850) was a U.S. Senator from New Hampshire from 1842 to 1843. Senator Wilcox may also refer to:

Benjamin M. Wilcox (1854–1912), New York State Senate
Craig Wilcox (born c. 1967), Illinois State Senate
Edward A. Wilcox (1830–1910), Illinois State Senate
Fred M. Wilcox (South Dakota politician) (1858–1938), South Dakota State Senate
Fred M. Wilcox (Wisconsin politician) (1870–1944), Wisconsin State Senate
Roy C. Wilcox (1891–1975), Connecticut State Senate
Roy P. Wilcox (1873–1946), Wisconsin State Senate